East 102nd Avenue station is a MAX light rail station in Portland, Oregon. It serves the Blue Line and is the 15th stop eastbound on the current Eastside MAX branch.

The station is located at the intersection of East Burnside Street and NE/SE 102nd Avenue. This station has staggered side platforms, which sit on either side of the cross street, because the route runs around this station on Burnside Street in the median. Going westbound, it is the last station to be served only by the Blue Line until Beaverton Central.

Bus line connections
This station is served by the following bus lines:
15 - Belmont/NW 23rd
20 - Burnside/Stark

External links
Station information (with eastbound ID number) from TriMet
Station information (with westbound ID number) from TriMet
MAX Light Rail Stations – more general TriMet page

MAX Light Rail stations
MAX Blue Line
1986 establishments in Oregon
Railway stations in the United States opened in 1986
Railway stations in Portland, Oregon